Catherine Lamb (born 1982 in Olympia, Washington) is an American composer and violist, and a winner of the 2020 Ernst von Siemens Composers' Prize.

Biography
Lamb describes her music as exploring "the interaction of tone, summations of shapes and shadows, phenomenological expansions, the architecture of the liminal (states in between outside/inside), and the long introduction form". Most of her works explore extended harmonic spaces in just intonation. Lamb explained her compositional philosophy in The Wire: "I follow the philosophy that the most intense sound is not the most intensive... I don’t agree with those who believe that sounds need to be pushed in order to be physical, or that they need to be loud in order to hear difference or summation tones. Particularly when working with particular tonal colourations and shadings, the more the tones are played in a plain and relaxed manner with room to blossom, the more expressive and generative they might become.”

Lamb's notable works include divisio spiralis (2019), curvo totalitas, Parallaxis Forma (2016), muto infinitas (2016), Point/Wave (2015), Matter/Moving (2012), and the Prisma Interius series (2015–present). She was also the film score composer for Anhe Ghore Da Daan. She has collaborated with Eliane Radigue, Marc Sabat, and Johnny Chang; received commissions from the BBC Orchestra, Ensemble Dedalus, Konzert Minimal, the London Contemporary Orchestra, NeoN, Plus/Minus, and Yarn/Wire; and awards and grants from the Ernst von Siemens Music Prize, Foundation for Contemporary Arts, Henry Cowell Foundation, and Akademie Schloss Solitude, among others.

Lamb studied at CalArts with James Tenney and Michael Pisaro and independently with Mani Kaul, and received her MFA from Bard College.

References

Living people
1982 births
Experimental composers
American violists
Women violists
American experimental musicians
21st-century American composers
21st-century classical composers
American classical composers
American women classical composers
Bard College alumni
California Institute of the Arts alumni
Ernst von Siemens Composers' Prize winners
21st-century American women musicians
Musicians from Olympia, Washington
Classical musicians from Washington (state)
21st-century women composers
20th-century violists
21st-century violists